Parischasia is a genus of beetles in the family Cerambycidae, containing the following species:

 Parischasia chamenoisi Tavakilian & Peñaherrera-Leiva, 2005
 Parischasia ligulatipennis (Gounelle, 1911)

References

Rhinotragini